Ratliff Boon (January 18, 1781 – November 20, 1844) was the second Governor of Indiana from September 12 to December 5, 1822, taking office following the resignation of Governor Jonathan Jennings' after his election to Congress. A prominent politician in the state, Boon was instrumental the formation of the state Democratic Party, and he supported President Andrew Jackson's policies during his six terms representing Indiana in the United States House of Representatives.

Early life

Background and education
Ratliff Boon was born January 18, 1781, in Franklin County, North Carolina, the son of Jesse and Kessiah Boon. At a young age he moved with his parents to Warren County, Kentucky, where he attended a public grade school and later apprenticed as a gunsmith in Danville, Kentucky. In 1801 he was married to Delilah Anderson, together the couple had seven children. In 1809 he moved to what is now Boon Township of Warrick County, Indiana. Boonville, the county seat, was later named in his honor. At the outbreak of the War of 1812, Boon joined the Indiana Territorial militia and eventually rose to the rank of colonel.

Public office

Legislator
Warrick County was organized in 1813 and Boon was appointed by Governor Thomas Posey to the position of County Treasurer. In 1816 he was elected to the first state legislature where he served two one-year terms. During his terms, his primary accomplishment was successfully promoting legislation to divide Warrick County into three separate counties. He was elected to the state senate in December 1818 but resigned after winning the election to become the second Lieutenant Governor in December 1819.

Christopher Harrison had resigned his position as lieutenant governor after a scandal, leaving no incumbent. Two other men briefly competed against Boon for the position, but he defeated them in the general election, 7,397 votes to his closest competitors 3,882. In 1820 the legislature passed laws to lower the wolf population. Wolves had been creating havoc on the frontier. They offered a premium reward for wolf pelts, Boon capitalized on the new law and earned more than seven-hundred dollars by killing wolves. His success led to the rapid repeal of the law which quickly became a drain on the state's limited resources.

Governor

In 1822 he was re-elected as lieutenant governor on a ticket with William Hendricks. When Governor Jonathan Jennings resigned to take a seat in Congress, Boon succeeded him and became the second governor of the state on September 12, 1822 and served until Hendricks's inauguration on December 5, 1822. Boon's only act of consequence during his short time as governor was to conduct a census of the area  purchased by the Treaty of St. Mary's and make recommendations for the creation of counties in the region. His proposal was adopted by the General Assembly, which organized county governments and created three seats in the assembly to provide representation to the subjects of the census. Boon returned to the lieutenant governor's office and remained in that position until January 30, 1824, when he resigned after winning the election to the United States House of Representatives.

Congressman
Boon was elected as a Jacksonian and served in Congress from March 4, 1825, to March 3, 1827. He was unsuccessful in his re-election attempt in 1826, defeated by Thomas H. Blake who ran on an internal improvement platform which Boon's party was opposed to. During the term he sat out of office, he was instrumental in establishing the Democratic Party in Indiana. Up until that time, there were no formal political parties in the state, and all politicians loosely affiliated with the Democratic-Republican Party. He ran again for the office in 1828, and won. He served in Congress again from March 4, 1829 to March 3, 1839. While in congress he was chairman of the Committee on Public Lands from 1835 until 1839. He made an unsuccessful run for re-election in 1839, and was defeated by Oliver H. Smith.

The same year of his defeat, Boon moved to Louisiana, Missouri. In Missouri he quickly rose in prominence and became a fierce opponent of  Thomas H. Benton and the pro-slavery faction of the state government. In 1844 he ran for Congress again, hoping to defeat the pro-slavery candidate, but he became ill and withdrew from the race. Boon remained sick and died shortly after hearing of his party's victory in the election. He died there on November 20, 1844. He is interred in Riverview Cemetery of Louisiana, his son, Baily Hart Boon, later erected a monument over his grave.

References
Notes

Bibliography

External links
Biography from Indiana State Library
Ratliff Boon at FindAGrave

1781 births
1844 deaths
Democratic-Republican Party state governors of the United States
Democratic Party governors of Indiana
Democratic Party Indiana state senators
Lieutenant Governors of Indiana
Indiana Democratic-Republicans
People from Louisiana, Missouri
Democratic Party members of the Indiana House of Representatives
People from Warrick County, Indiana
People from Indiana in the War of 1812
People from Franklin County, North Carolina
Jacksonian members of the United States House of Representatives from Indiana
Democratic Party members of the United States House of Representatives from Indiana
19th-century American politicians